Infinite Dendrogram is a Japanese light novel series written by Sakon Kaidō. Originally published as a web novel, the series has since been published by Hobby Japan featuring illustrations by Taiki. As of September 1, 2022, nineteen volumes have been published. The light novel series was adapted into a manga by Kami Imai and published by Hobby Japan, with ten volumes released as of June 1, 2022. Both the novel and manga series are licensed by J-Novel Club.



Light novel

Manga

References

Infinite Dendrogram